Justin DeVaughn “Scoop” Robinson (born April 12, 1995) is an American basketball player for BCM Gravelines-Dunkerque of the LNB Pro A. He played college basketball for the Monmouth Hawks.

College career
Robinson did not receive many scholarship offers out of high school due to his small stature. He scored 22 points in a 70-68 win over Notre Dame on November 26, 2015, the program's first victory over a ranked opponent. As a junior, Robinson averaged 20.2 points, 3.7 assists, and 2.1 steals per game. He led Monmouth to its first ever MAAC regular season title and a school record 25 victories. As a result, he was named first-team All-MAAC for the second straight year as well as MAAC Player of the Year. On three occasions Robinson was named MAAC Player of the week. Robinson also played football for Kingston High school where he played defensive back.

Robinson was again named MAAC Player of the Year in his senior season after averaging 19.7 points per game and leading Monmouth to the regular-season MAAC championship. He is one of three players in conference history to ever be named Player of the Year twice in their collegiate career. He scored his 2,000th career point in his final college game, a first round National Invitation Tournament loss to Ole Miss. Robinson graduated Monmouth as the all-time leading scorer in school history, second all-time in assist, and second all-time in career steals.

Professional career
In the summer of 2017, Robinson signed with the Miami Heat for the NBA Summer League. He ultimately signed with the Russian club Avtodor Saratov on August 2, 2017. On July 5, 2018, Robinson signed with the French team Élan Chalon. Robinson led the league in assists per game at 8.2 and averaged 15.2 points per game. He re-signed with the team for the 2019-20 season.

On August 2, 2020, he has signed with Victoria Libertas Pesaro of the Italian Lega Basket Serie A (LBA).

On July 6, 2021, he has signed with Brose Bamberg of the Basketball Bundesliga (BBL) On January 5, 2022, Robinson played against former Monmouth University teammate, Maximilian Dileo for the Hamberg Towers. Robinson scored 7 points and Dileo scored 4 points. On their second meeting, Robinson scored 23 points with 7 assists to help send Bamberg into the playoffs. 

On August 3, 2022, he has signed with BCM Gravelines-Dunkerque of the LNB Pro A.

References

External links
Monmouth Hawks bio

1995 births
Living people
American expatriate basketball people in France
American expatriate basketball people in Germany
American expatriate basketball people in Italy
American expatriate basketball people in Russia
American men's basketball players
Basketball players from New York (state)
BC Avtodor Saratov players
BCM Gravelines players
Brose Bamberg players
Élan Chalon players
Lega Basket Serie A players
Monmouth Hawks men's basketball players
Point guards
Sportspeople from Kingston, New York
Victoria Libertas Pallacanestro players